David H. Morton (February 21, 1886 – June 13, 1957) was an American poet.

Born in Elkton, Kentucky, he graduated from Vanderbilt University in 1909. Morton played on the varsity football team. After a decade of newspaper work, starting at the Louisville Courier-Journal,  he became a teacher in the high school at Morristown, New Jersey.  Beginning in 1924, he taught at Amherst College.

His work appeared in Harper's Magazine. He is noted for having written a fan letter to Dashiell Hammett.

Awards
 Golden Rose Award
 National Arts Club Prize

Works

Poetry
 "The Kings Are Passing Deathward", Poetry X
 
 
 
Nocturnes and Autumnals 1928 publisher Knickerbocker Press

Criticism

Editor

Anthologies

References

Sources
The Kentucky Encyclopedia

External links
 
 
 

1886 births
1957 deaths
People from Elkton, Kentucky
American male poets
Vanderbilt University alumni
Amherst College faculty
Vanderbilt Commodores football players
20th-century American poets
20th-century American male writers